Deucalion may refer to:

Person 
 In Greek mythology, see Deucalion (mythology)

Science
 Deucalion, a red alga genus in the family Wrangeliaceae
 Deucalion (beetle), a beetle in the family Cerambycidae
 53311 Deucalion, a trans-Neptunian object

Ships 
 USS Deucalion (AR-15) a repair ship built for the United States Navy during World War II

Fiction
 Deucalion (novel), a 1995 novel by Brian Caswell
 Deucalion, one of the names of the main character from Dean Koontz and Kevin J. Anderson's series of novels, Dean Koontz's Frankenstein
 Deucalion, a vampiric bloodline in the role-playing game Vampire: The Requiem
 Deucalion, the name of a dragon in Dianna Wynne Jones book Dark Lord of Derkholm
 Deucalion, the name of a fictional spaceship in Kiddy Grade
 Deucalion, the name of a werewolf in Teen Wolf (2011 TV series)